Estero Bay Preserve State Park, the first aquatic nature preserve established in Florida, is a  Florida State Park located  near Estero, between Fort Myers and Naples. It consists of the water, inlets, and islands along  of Estero Bay. Activities include fishing, and boating, bicycling, canoeing,  and wildlife viewing. Among the wildlife of the park are gopher tortoises, fiddler crabs, and bald eagles. The park is open from 8:00 A.M. until sundown year-round.

The old rail bed of the Seaboard Air Line Railway can be found near the Florida Power and Light easement headed northwest.  This section has now been orphaned as developments to the north and south have isolated this section.  The Seaboard Air Line Railway was once one of two railroads that served southwest Florida and serves as a point of interest in the park on a hike.

External links
 Estero Bay Preserve State Park at Florida State Parks

State parks of Florida
Parks in Lee County, Florida